Stephen L. Sparks (born March 28, 1975) is a retired Major League Baseball pitcher. He played during one season at the major league level for the Pittsburgh Pirates. He was drafted by the Pirates in the 28th round of the  amateur draft.

References
"Steve Sparks Statistics". The Baseball Cube. 12 January 2008.
"Steve Sparks Statistics". Baseball-Reference. 12 January 2008.

External links

1975 births
Living people
Pittsburgh Pirates players
Nashville Sounds players
South Alabama Jaguars baseball players
Major League Baseball pitchers
Baseball players from Alabama
Sportspeople from Mobile, Alabama
Erie SeaWolves players
Augusta GreenJackets players
Lynchburg Hillcats players
Hickory Crawdads players
Altoona Curve players
Shreveport Swamp Dragons players
Memphis Redbirds players
Fresno Grizzlies players
Faulkner Eagles baseball players